The Talk of the Town (Swedish: Det sags pa stan) is a 1941 Swedish drama film directed by Per Lindberg and starring Olof Sandborg,  Carl Ström and  Marianne Löfgren. The film's sets were designed by the art director Bertil Duroj. Location shooting took place around Nyköping.

Synopsis
In a small Swedish town anonymous letters are sent to five families, dredging up events from the past that they would prefer to keep buried.

Cast

 Olof Sandborg as 	Forsenius, lawyer
 Carl Ström as 	Dr. Grip
 Hilding Gavle as 	Police inspector Nilsson
 Marianne Löfgren as 	Jeanette
 Arnold Sjöstrand as 	Martin Bilt, teacher
 Gudrun Brost as Greta Bilt
 Torsten Bergström as Landowner Fristedt
 Elsa Marianne von Rosen as 	Bessie Fristedt
 Oscar Ljung as Törring, pharmacist
 Mona Mårtenson as 	Mrs. Törring
 Bengt Ekerot as 	Sven Törring
 Börje Nilsson as 	Nils Törring
 Elsa Widborg as	Mrs. Jansson
 Willy Peters as 	Friis, watchmaker
 Emil Fjellström as 	Karlsson
 Inga-Lilly Forsström as 	Petra
 Linnéa Hillberg as 	Selma Grip
 Peter Höglund as 	The gardener
 John Norrman as The photographer
 Folke Helleberg as 	Count Axel
 Helga Hallén as 	Alice
 Charley Paterson as Larsson, Fristedt's servant
 Robert Ryberg as 	Man at cafe
 Gösta Bodin as Man at cafe
 Helga Brofeldt as Shop assistant
 Thyra Larsson as 	Dam på basaren
 Siri Olson as Biträde
 Lisbeth Bodin as 	Flicka i sångkören
 Mary Hjelte as 	Expedit
 John Elfström as 	Poliskonstapel 
 Agda Helin as 	Baderska
 Nancy Dalunde as 	Girl at the bazaar
 Helge Hagerman as 	Guest at cafe
 Astrid Bodin as 	Kiosktant
 Erik Rosén as Överste Fristedt
 Yngve Nyqvist as 	Domaren 
 Bojan Westin as Ung flicka 
 Anna-Stina Wåglund as 	Telefonist 
 Mona Geijer-Falkner as Old Woman
 Eva Dahlbeck as Dancing woman

References

Bibliography 
 Qvist, Per Olov & von Bagh, Peter. Guide to the Cinema of Sweden and Finland. Greenwood Publishing Group, 2000.

External links 
 

1941 films
Swedish drama films
1941 drama films
1940s Swedish-language films
Films directed by Per Lindberg
1940s Swedish films